Austrolycopodium is a genus of lycophytes in the family Lycopodiaceae. In the Pteridophyte Phylogeny Group classification of 2016 (PPG I), it is placed in the subfamily Lycopodioideae. Some sources do not recognize the genus, sinking it into Lycopodium. Austrolycopodium species are mostly native to the temperate southern hemisphere.

Species
, the Checklist of Ferns and Lycophytes of the World recognized the following species:
Austrolycopodium aberdaricum (Chiov.) Holub
Austrolycopodium alboffii (Rolleri) Holub
Austrolycopodium confertum (Willd.) Holub
Austrolycopodium erectum (Phil.) Holub
Austrolycopodium fastigiatum (R.Br.) Holub
Austrolycopodium magellanicum (P.Beauv.) Holub
Austrolycopodium paniculatum (Desv. ex Poir.) Holub

References

Lycopodiaceae
Lycophyte genera